Deir Billa (Arabic: دير بيلاَ) is a municipality in the Batroun District, North Governorate of Lebanon. The village is located near the towns of Wata Fares and Daael. The municipality is member of Federation of Bcharreh District Municipalities. In 2009, there were 759 voters in the town and that number rose to 805 in 2014.

References 

Batroun
Populated places in the North Governorate